Seventeen teams participated in the 1990 ICC Trophy, the fourth edition of the tournament. No teams were making their debut, but Singapore returned to competition for the first time since the 1982 edition.

Argentina
Only players who appeared in at least one match at the tournament are listed. The leading run-scorer is marked with a dagger (†) and the leading wicket-taker with a double dagger (‡).

 Leo Alonso
 Douglas Annand
 Sergio Ciaburri
 Martin Cortabarria
 Tony Ferguson
 Donald Forrester
 Alexander Gooding
 Bernardo Irigoyen

 Guillermo Kirschbaum †
 Alan Morris
 Miguel Morris
 Christopher Nino
 Hernan Pereyra ‡
 Brian Roberts
 Michael Ryan
 T. E. Trabucco

Source: ESPNcricinfo

Bangladesh
Only players who appeared in at least one match at the tournament are listed. The leading run-scorer is marked with a dagger (†) and the leading wicket-taker with a double dagger (‡).

 Akram Khan
 Aminul Islam
 Azhar Hossain
 Enamul Haque
 Faruk Ahmed
 Gazi Ashraf
 Gholam Nousher ‡
 Golam Faruq

 Harunur Rashid
 Jahangir Alam
 Minhajul Abedin †
 Nasir Ahmed
 Nurul Abedin
 Shanewas Shahid
 Zahid Razzak

Source: ESPNcricinfo

Bermuda
Only players who appeared in at least one match at the tournament are listed. The leading run-scorer is marked with a dagger (†) and the leading wicket-taker with a double dagger (‡).

 Arnold Amory
 Gary Brangman
 Terry Burgess
 Maxwell Curtis
 Allan Douglas
 Pacer Edwards
 Noel Gibbons
 Ricky Hill †

 Olin Jones
 Roger Leverock
 Darrin Lewis
 Kyle Lightbourne ‡
 Andre Manders
 Arnold Manders
 Tyrone Smith
 Wendell Smith

Source: ESPNcricinfo

Canada
Only players who appeared in at least one match at the tournament are listed. The leading run-scorer is marked with a dagger (†) and the leading wicket-taker with a double dagger (‡).

 Garvin Budhoo
 Christopher Chappell
 Ron Dipchand
 Andrew Dornellas
 Derick Etwaroo
 Tony Gardner ‡
 Davis Joseph

 Farooq Kirmani
 Ingleton Liburd †
 Martin Prashad
 Paul Prashad
 Roy Ramsammy
 Barry Seebaran
 Danny Singh

Source: ESPNcricinfo

Denmark
Only players who appeared in at least one match at the tournament are listed. The leading run-scorer is marked with a dagger (†) and the leading wicket-taker with a double dagger (‡).

 Aftab Ahmed
 Niels Bindslev
 Jens Bredo
 Atif Butt
 Allan From-Hansen
 Jesper Gregersen
 Søren Henriksen
 Johnny Jensen †

 Peter Jensen
 Tim Jensen
 Søren Mikkelsen
 Ole Mortensen ‡
 Jens Priess
 Søren Sørensen
 Ole Stoustrup
 Steen Thomsen

Source: ESPNcricinfo

East and Central Africa
Only players who appeared in at least one match at the tournament are listed. The leading run-scorer is marked with a dagger (†) and the leading wicket-taker with a double dagger (‡).

 Haroon Bags
 Balraj Bouri
 H. Davda
 Pravin Desai
 W. Kibukumusoke
 Sajaad Lakha ‡
 S. Naik
 Hitash Patadia †

 Dinesh Patel
 Janak Patel
 Jayesh Patel
 Faizel Sarigat
 Gulam Shariff
 H. Tejani
 Sam Walusimbi
 Yona Waphakhabulo

Source: ESPNcricinfo

Fiji
Only players who appeared in at least one match at the tournament are listed. The leading run-scorer is marked with a dagger (†) and the leading wicket-taker with a double dagger (‡).

 S. K. G. Amin
 Taione Batina
 A. P. Browne
 Cecil Browne
 Stephen Campbell
 Joeli Mateyawa
 Neil Maxwell
 Asaeli Sorovakatini

 Jone Sorovakatini †
 Lesi Sorovakatini
 Atunaisi Tawatatau
 Ilikena Vuli
 Apenisa Waqaninamata ‡
 Richard Wotta

Source: ESPNcricinfo

Gibraltar
Only players who appeared in at least one match at the tournament are listed. The leading run-scorer is marked with a dagger (†) and the leading wicket-taker with a double dagger (‡).

 A. Benson
 Steve Boylan
 Bob Brooks ‡
 Richard Buzaglo
 Tim Buzaglo
 S. Chinnappa †
 Gary De'Ath
 H. Finch

 Vince Kenny
 A. Raikes
 Jeffrey Rhodes
 Clive Robinson
 Christian Rocca
 Willie Scott
 F. Vasquez

Source: ESPNcricinfo

Hong Kong
Only players who appeared in at least one match at the tournament are listed. The leading run-scorer is marked with a dagger (†) and the leading wicket-taker with a double dagger (‡).

 David Brettell
 Ray Brewster
 Glyn Davies
 David Evans
 Riswan Farouq
 Bob Fotheringham
 David Jones
 Krish Kumar

 Jason Marsden †
 David Paull
 Nanda Perera
 Martin Sabine
 Tarun Sawney
 Nigel Stearns
 Salauddin Tariq ‡
 Yarman Vachha

Source: ESPNcricinfo

Israel
Only players who appeared in at least one match at the tournament are listed. The leading run-scorer is marked with a dagger (†) and the leading wicket-taker with a double dagger (‡).

 Hillel Awasker
 Colwyn Callendar
 Aby Daniels
 Aaron Davidson
 Solomon Erulkar †
 Benny Gadkar
 Michael Jacob
 Nissam Jhirad

 Benzie Kehimkar
 Jerrold Kessel
 Zion Moshe
 Alan Moss ‡
 Yonathan Osker
 Stanley Perlman
 Shimshon Raj
 Nissam Reuben

Source: ESPNcricinfo

Kenya
Only players who appeared in at least one match at the tournament are listed. The leading run-scorer is marked with a dagger (†) and the leading wicket-taker with a double dagger (‡).

 Dipak Chudasama
 Sandeep Gupta
 Tariq Iqbal
 Muslim Kanji
 Aasif Karim ‡
 Sibtain Kassamali
 Daniel Macdonald
 Alfred Njuguna

 Bernard Odumbe
 Martin Odumbe
 Maurice Odumbe †
 Tito Odumbe
 Bharat Shah
 Martin Suji
 David Tikolo
 Tom Tikolo

Source: ESPNcricinfo

Malaysia
Only players who appeared in at least one match at the tournament are listed. The leading run-scorer is marked with a dagger (†) and the leading wicket-taker with a double dagger (‡).

 Harris Abu Bakar
 S. Bell
 Rakesh Chander ‡
 S. W. Hong
 Saat Jalil
 S. Menon
 S. Meyor
 Marimuthu Muniandy ‡

 Banerji Nair
 Hatta Pattabongi
 S. Rajkumar
 Kunjiraman Ramadas
 W. J. Ranggi
 Asgari Stevens †
 Tan Kim Hing
 V. Vijayalingham

Source: ESPNcricinfo

Netherlands
Only players who appeared in at least one match at the tournament are listed. The leading run-scorer is marked with a dagger (†) and the leading wicket-taker with a double dagger (‡).

 Flavian Aponso
 Paul-Jan Bakker
 Nolan Clarke †
 Oscar Danser
 Tim de Leede
 Eric Dulfer
 Godfrey Edwards
 Rupert Gomes

 Floris Jansen
 Roland Lefebvre ‡
 Steven Lubbers
 Cees Ruskamp
 Reinout Scholte
 Robert van Oosterom
 Andre van Troost
 Rob Vos

Source: ESPNcricinfo

Papua New Guinea
Only players who appeared in at least one match at the tournament are listed. The leading run-scorer is marked with a dagger (†) and the leading wicket-taker with a double dagger (‡).

 Numa Alu
 Charles Amini
 Tani Amini
 Tau Ao †
 Renagi Ila
 Kosta Ilaraki
 Daure Lohia

 Kula Loi ‡
 William Maha
 Vavine Pala
 Ola Raka
 Tuku Raka
 Gamu Ravu

Source: ESPNcricinfo

Singapore
Only players who appeared in at least one match at the tournament are listed. The leading run-scorer is marked with a dagger (†) and the leading wicket-taker with a double dagger (‡).

 Mukhtar Ahmed
 S. Anura
 B. Balakrishnan †
 B. G. Field
 Mahmood Gaznavi
 Imran Hamid
 D. B. How
 S. A. Iftikhar

 Mohanvelu Jeevanathan
 B. Murugamoorthy
 Stacey Muruthi
 Mohanvelu Neethianathan
 T. E. Seal ‡
 Harnam Singh
 Selvanayagam Sivalingham
 Ravi Thambinayagam

Source: ESPNcricinfo

United States
Only players who appeared in at least one match at the tournament are listed. The leading run-scorer is marked with a dagger (†) and the leading wicket-taker with a double dagger (‡).

 Zamin Amin ‡
 Reginald Benjamin
 Hubert Blackman
 Early Daley
 Neil Lashkari
 Terry Mills
 Errol Peart †
 Kamran Rasheed

 H. Russell
 Sew Shivnarine
 Sam Smith
 Victor Stoute
 Kevin Wedderburn
 John Willoughby
 Ray Wynter

Source: ESPNcricinfo

Zimbabwe
Only players who appeared in at least one match at the tournament are listed. The leading run-scorer is marked with a dagger (†) and the leading wicket-taker with a double dagger (‡).

 Kevin Arnott
 Eddo Brandes ‡
 Jon Brent
 Gavin Briant
 David Dolphin
 Kevin Duers
 Andy Flower †
 Grant Flower

 David Houghton
 Wayne James
 Malcolm Jarvis
 Grant Paterson
 Andy Pycroft
 Colin Robertson
 Ali Shah
 John Traicos

Source: ESPNcricinfo

Sources
 CricketArchive: Averages by teams, Unibind ICC Trophy 1990
 ESPNcricinfo: Unibind ICC Trophy, 1990 / Statistics

Cricket squads
ICC World Cup Qualifier